The following highways are numbered Route 310:

Canada
 New Brunswick Route 310
 Newfoundland and Labrador Route 310
 Prince Edward Island Route 310
 Saskatchewan Highway 310

China
 China National Highway 310

Costa Rica
 National Route 310

Japan
 Japan National Route 310

United States
 Interstate 310:
  Interstate 310 (Louisiana)
 Interstate 310 (former)
  Interstate 310 (Mississippi)
  U.S. Route 310
  Arkansas Highway 310
  Florida State Road 310 (former)
  Georgia State Route 310
  Hawaii Route 310
  Kentucky Route 310
  Louisiana Highway 310 (former)
  Maryland Route 310
  Minnesota State Highway 310
  Mississippi Highway 310
  Montana Secondary Highway 310
 New York:
  New York State Route 310
 New York State Route 310 (former)
  County Route 310 (Erie County, New York)
 County Route 310 (Westchester County, New York)
  Ohio State Route 310
  Pennsylvania Route 310
  Puerto Rico Highway 310
  South Carolina Highway 310
  Tennessee State Route 310
 Texas:
  Texas State Highway 310
  Farm to Market Road 310
  Utah State Route 310
  Virginia State Route 310
 Virginia State Route 310 (former)
  Washington State Route 310
  West Virginia Route 310
  Wisconsin Highway 310
  Wyoming Highway 310